The 1999 season of Úrvalsdeild was the 88th season of league football in Iceland. KR won their 21st title. Valur and recently promoted Víkingur were relegated. The competition was known as Landssímadeild, due to its sponsorship by the now-defunct company, Landssíminn.

Final league position

Results
Each team played every opponent once home and away for a total of 18 matches.

Top goalscorers

References

Úrvalsdeild karla (football) seasons
Iceland
Iceland
1999 in Icelandic football